Flaminio Torrigiani or Torrigiano (1729–November, 1792) was an Italian physician and anatomist.

Career
Rasori was born in Corniglio. He began studying medicine in Florence, studying under Angelo Nannoni. After graduation, he became in 1768 professor of anatomy at the University of Parma. He later became professor of theoretical medicine and experimental physics. He was surgeon for the Ducal court and taught anatomy at the Accademia delle Belle Arti in Parma. Among his publications, are:
Lessons of Physiology and Pathology
Lessons of Anatomy
Lessons of Experimental Physics
Segni da' quali si potra facilmente conoscere la malattia che serpeggia nelle bestie bovine (1771 Parma)
Trattato dell flogosi
Poesia varie

In Parma, he was a teacher of the physician Giovanni Rasori and GAD Tommasini.

References

1729 births
1792 deaths
18th-century Italian people
Physicians from Parma
Italian anatomists